Vengadathampatti is a village located in the Krishnagiri district of Tamil Nadu, India.

See also 
Category:Villages in Krishnagiri district
வேங்கடதம்பட்டி ஊராட்சி

References 

Villages in Krishnagiri district